Nagarkanda is an upazila of Faridpur District in the Division of Dhaka, Bangladesh.
In this upazila,  in the village of Kodalia,  the Pakistani Army killed at least 22 people including women and children on 1 June 1971. The incident is also recorded on film.

Geography
It has 51, 016 households and a total area of 379.02 km2.

Demographics
According to the 1991 Bangladesh census, Nagarkanda had a population of 267, 193. Males constituted 50.18% of the population, and females 49.82%. The population aged 18 or over was 131, 533. Nagarkanda had an average literacy rate of 22.6% (7+ years), against  the national average of 32.4%. Most of the people depends on cultivation of land. Rice, Jute, Onion are the main crops. Onion of this locality is famous all around the country.

Administration
Nagarkanda Upazila is divided into Nagarkanda Municipality and nine union parishads: Char Jashordi, Dangi, Fulsuti, Kaichail, Laskardia, Kodalia Shohid Nagar, Purapara, Ramnagar, and Talma. The union parishads are subdivided into 124 mauzas and 169 villages.

Nagarkanda Municipality is subdivided into 9 wards and 15 mahallas.

Education
 Talma Nazim Uddin High School. P.O. Talma.
 M.N Academy.(Est. 1916) zamindar of Baish Rashi established this Institute with the help of  the then Local Elite Class.
 Nagarkanda Govt College. P.O. Nagarkanda
 Nabocum college.
 Qasimul Ulum Islamia Madrasa Jungurdi Nagarkanda.
 Nagarkanda Girls School. P.O. Nagarkanda
 Laskardia Atiqur Rahman High school.
 Ramnagar High School. P.O. Kunjanagar 
  Krishnerdandi High School. P.O. Kunjanagar 
  Bilgobindapur High School. P.O. Kathia Kalibari 
 Islami Adarsha shishu shikkhaloy.P.O.Nagarkanda
  Fulsuti Abdul Alem Chowdhury High School.P.O Fulsuti

See also
Upazilas of Bangladesh
Districts of Bangladesh
Divisions of Bangladesh

References

Upazilas of Faridpur District